Ambt Doetinchem is a former municipality in the Dutch province of Gelderland. It consisted of the countryside surrounding the city of Doetinchem, which belonged to the separate municipality of Stad Doetinchem.

Ambt Doetinchem was a separate municipality between 1818 and 1920, when it merged with Stad Doetinchem.

References

Former municipalities of Gelderland
Doetinchem